Miss Chad (also known as "Miss TCHAD") is a  national beauty pageant in Chad. The pageant runs to select its winner to the Miss World. The Miss Tchad is sponsored by Ministry of Culture, Chad since 2014.

Titleholders

References

Chad
Chadian awards
Entertainment events in Chad